UMS Dréan is an Algerian football club located in Dréan, Algeria. The club currently plays in the Ligue Régional I.

References

Football clubs in Algeria
1932 establishments in Algeria
Association football clubs established in 1932